The role of the Ambassador and Permanent Representative of Morocco to the United Nations is as the leader of the Moroccan delegation to the United Nations in New York and as head of the Permanent Mission of Morocco to the UN. The position has the rank and status of an Ambassador Extraordinary and Plenipotentiary and is also the representative of Morocco in the United Nations Security Council (1963–1964, 1992–1993, 2012–2013).

The Permanent Representative, currently Omar Hilale, is charged with representing Morocco, both through its non-permanent seat on the U.N. Security Council and also during plenary meetings of the General Assembly, except in the rare situation in which a more senior officer (such as the Minister of Foreign Affairs or the King) is present.

Office holders

See also
Morocco and the United Nations
Foreign relations of Morocco

References

External links
Permanent Mission of the Kingdom of Morocco to the United Nations

Permanent Representatives of Morocco to the United Nations
Morocco